The 1986 UC Davis football team represented the University of California, Davis as a member of the Northern California Athletic Conference (NCAC) during the 1986 NCAA Division II football season. Led by 17th-year head coach Jim Sochor, UC Davis compiled an overall record of 10–1 with a mark of 5–0 in conference play, winning the NCAC for the 16th title consecutive season. 1986 was the team's 17th consecutive winning season. With the 5–0 conference record, the team stretched their conference winning streak to 31 games dating back to the 1981 season. The Aggies were ranked no lower than No. 4 in the NCAA Division II polls during the season. The team outscored its opponents 361 to 213 for the season. The Aggies played home games at Toomey Field in Davis, California.

Schedule

UC Davis players in the NFL
No UC Davis Aggies players were selected in the 1987 NFL Draft.

The following finished their college career in 1986, were not drafted, but played in the NFL.

References

UC Davis
UC Davis Aggies football seasons
Northern California Athletic Conference football champion seasons
UC Davis Aggies football